Chinna is a 2005 Indian Tamil-language romantic thriller film directed by Sundar C. It stars Arjun and Sneha in lead roles.

Plot
The film begins with Gayathri (Sneha) marrying an irrigation engineer (Vikramaditya) against her wishes. As she conducts her marriage with mechanical unconsciousness, her sunken heart reflects her past. Gayathri, a marine student, goes to Rameswaram to study coral reefs and marine ecosystems while staying with her uncle and cousin in a fisherman hamlet. There, she witnesses Chinna (Arjun) and his assistants - local mobsters working for a gang - committing pitiless and violent crimes. Though she wanted to report these crimes to the local SP, her uncle and cousin dissuade her. Meanwhile, she asks her uncle for a guide to take her to locations rich in marine life. Her uncle asks Chinna to help Gayathri in her pursuit. After a couple of close encounters with Chinna, Gayathri understands his soft, childlike nature and vows to reform him as a socially acceptable man. Later, love blossoms between them. Even as Chinna tries to make his life straight, a violent feud ensues between him and the local gang. Trying to save Gayathri, Chinna kills the gang leader and is sentenced to life imprisonment. Taking advantage of Chinna's absence, Gayathri's parents marry her to the irrigation engineer. As the story ploughs through in the second half, Chinna, characterized by the obsession with "Gayathri", kills people working against his goal to attain his ladylove. At the end, after much drama, when Chinna almost killed Gayathri's husband, Gayathri shot him in order to save her husband. Chinna asked Gayathri if she had feelings for him before this, at least for a second. Just after she shakes her head saying yes, he jumps off the building. The movie ends there, indicating his death.

Cast

 Arjun as Chinna
 Sneha as Gayathri
 Vijayakumar as Gayathri's uncle and ex-police officer
 Vikramaditya as Gayathri's husband
 Vadivelu as Kumar
 Livingston as Police Officer
 Mansoor Ali Khan as Chinna's friend
 Ponnambalam as Chinna's friend
 Manivannan as Sabapathy
 Vinu Chakravarthy as Gayathri's uncle
 Jayaprakash Reddy as Chinna's ex-boss
 Shreekumar as Soosai
 Aarthi as Maha
 M. S. Bhaskar
 Riyaz Khan
 Besant Ravi
 Kiran Rathod, Special appearance in an item number Song

Music

Critical reception
Balaji B of Thiraipadam wrote, "Chinnaa takes over the crown from Anbe Sivam for being the most un-Sundar.C-like Sundar.C film ever! Confusion, chaos and comedy, atleast [sic] one of which is always a trademark of his films, are nowhere to be seen here." Indiaglitz wrote "Sundar C has a penchant for comedy capers that are low on logic but high on entertainment. Chinna is unlike Sundar C's film, which is not just very serious but also lacks his trademark humour. However thanks to a fast narration and good performance by Sneha, Chinna manages to leave an impression with the audience."

References

External links

2005 films
2005 action thriller films
2000s Tamil-language films
Films directed by Sundar C.
Tamil remakes of Hindi films
Indian action thriller films